Ja'Warren Hooker (born September 24, 1978) is a track and field sprinter and former University of Washington football player. 

Hooker is one of seven children and has not seen his biological father since he was little. Hooker's step father is a chemist for the Washington State Agriculture Department. He played halfback for Ellensburg High School He ended with 57 touchdowns and 5,100 yards. Hooker went from there to play football at the University of Washington. Hooker also played basketball for his high school, where he shot 40% from 3 point range.

When Hooker decided to go to the University of Washington, he was escorted around by the girls soccer star Marisa Lyons. He developed a relationship with her, and on July 7, a night where he had just been discussing the future with her, she died in his arms of cardiac arrhythmia. When attending her funeral Ja'Warren held her teddy bear and said "I've never been defeated in a race, but Marisa beat me to heaven, I wish it had been a tie."

Career highlights
Hooker made the 2000 Olympic relay team as a back-up member, but he did not get to compete. Before this Hooker was the 1997 USA Junior Champion in the 100 meters.

High school career
In 1995 Hooker won the 100 meters race in 10.71 s as a Sophomore in high school to win his first appearance at the Pasco Invitational. The Pasco Invitational features top high school athletes and teams from primarily Washington state with teams also competing from Oregon and other states. This track meet features more competition than the WIAA State Track and Field Championships. This is because, at State, the best from each classification compete only against others in their classification. In the Pasco Invitational, all athletes compete against each other regardless of their school's classification/size; the competition is also deeper due to the additional out-of-state athletes who come to the Invite.

The following year Hooker returned to the Pasco Invitational to win the sprint double in the 100 m (10.68 s) and 200 m (21.82 s). His final chance to compete at the Pasco Invitational was not wasted as he performed another sprint double in record fashion. Hooker won the 100 meters in 10.44 s to set a meet record and the 200 meters in 21.40 s also for a meet record. Hooker competed in 5 events over those 3 years running at the Pasco Invitational and won all 5 times. Hooker has the Washington State Record for the 100 meters set at 10.27 s.

References

External links

Seattle Times: 2000 Summer Olympics - Ja'Warren Hooker
Northwest Runner, April 2001 - Speak Softly and Run Like the Wind - Washington's Fastest Human, Ja'Warren Hooker, Takes On the Wind
Columns, University of Washington Alumni Magazine, December 2005: Ja’Warren Hooker, ’01
Washington Huskies: Player Profile: Ja’Warren Hooker
USA Track & Field: Ja'Warren Hooker

1978 births
Living people
American male sprinters
Athletes (track and field) at the 2003 Pan American Games
University of Washington alumni
Pan American Games silver medalists for the United States
Pan American Games medalists in athletics (track and field)
People from Ellensburg, Washington
Medalists at the 2003 Pan American Games